IK Sirius, more commonly known simply as Sirius, is a Swedish football club located in Uppsala. The club is affiliated to the Upplands Fotbollförbund.

History

Early success 

The club was formed in 1907, with its first success coming in 1924 when they reached the Svenska Mästerskapet final (not to be confused with Svenska Serien, which never acquired an official status of deciding the Swedish Champions). In the final, they were trounced 5–0 by Fässbergs IF.

The Allsvenskan years 

The club spent the next forty years in lower division anonymity, before favourable economic circumstances enabled them to gain promotion to Allsvenskan in 1968, although they were relegated after just one season. The high point was arguably in the years 1973–1974, when the club again gained promotion to the highest league and its squad contained a number of high-profile players, such as Roland Grip, then a member of the Swedish national team.

Obscurity and comeback 

After the club's relegation from Allsvenskan in 1974, the club played in the second division until they plummeted to fourth division level following a couple of hard years in the beginning of the 1980s. The 1990s were mostly spent at a second tier level, i.e. the old Division 1, corresponding to the modern Superettan. The club then played the first five years of the 21st century in Division 2, before returning to Division 1 in 2006 (although still playing at a third tier level).

With new manager Magnus Pehrsson and prodigal son and goal-getter Olle Kullinger (starting his career with IF VP and later also having played with Enköpings SK, Halmstads BK and IF Brommapojkarna in Superettan and Allsvenskan) bearing the captaincy, the club finished the season in second place, which meant they had to qualify in order to gain promotion to Superettan. IK Sirius played the first leg at home against Väsby United on 25 October. Due to some seriously poor defending, Väsby were able to go 1–0 up just before the half-time break. Sirius recovered slightly in the second period, and were able to equalise in the 83rd minute. In the second leg, in front of about 1000 travelling fans, Sirius were completely dominant but also rather wasteful with their chances. They managed, however to break the deadlock in the 73rd minute, Olle Kullinger managing to knock a rebound past the Väsby keeper. With the aggregate score of 2–1, Sirius celebrated their 100th anniversary in the Superettan, much to the delight of their fans.

The first spell in Superettan 

Magnus Pehrsson resigned as manager and Pär Millqvist was appointed and brought in Gary Sundgren as his assistant manager. After a strong first half of the season the club finished 7th in Superettan 2007. The team struggled through most of the 2008-season but finally finished 12th and avoided relegation. Millqvist and Sundgren was sacked after the first six games and youth-team coaches Johan Mattsson and Andreas Brännström led the team for the rest of the season.

In preparation for the 2009 season they appointed Jens T Andersson from Väsby and AIK as new manager. Like the season before they struggled in the bottom of the league and with just five games left to play of the season Jens T Andersson resigned as manager due to the lack of good results. Assistant coach Andreas Brännström was once again hired as new head manager but this time he could not save the team from degradation.

In 2010 IK Sirius played in the third tier Division 1 Norra and finished 2nd in the table 5 points behind rivals Västerås SK and as a result they went through to the Superettan play-offs, where they went head-to-head with Jönköpings Södra. After a 0–1 defeat at home they lost the away game with 3–0 and faced another season in Division 1 Norra.

2011 the team was voted by all the managers of the league as favourites to win but failed to live up to the expectations.
They finished 3rd in Division 1 Norra, just 2 points from finishing first and goal-difference kept them from the second spot which leads to Superettan play-offs. As a result, coach Andreas Brännström and his assistant Antonio Andric was forced to leave the club after the season.

The Kim Bergstrand era 

On 17 November 2012 the club announced that the ex-Brommapojkarna manager Kim Bergstrand had been appointed as the new head coach. Soon thereafter Thomas Lagerlöf (ex-Väsby) was appointed as assistant manager.

In 2012 the team were once again the favourites to win the Division 1 Norra, and led the league by five points with three games left. A 0–1 home defeat to Vasalund and a 1–0 away win at Enköping set the team up for an all-decisive match against second-placed Östersunds FK. Sirius needed a draw to win the league, but lost at home 0–1 and ended up third, also behind BK Forward.

The 2013 season began with an unexpected success in the Swedish Cup, as Sirius defeated reigning Swedish champions IF Elfsborg to win their group and advance to the quarterfinals, where they were knocked out away to Öster, 1–2. The team had been bolstered by the signing of several experienced players, including former Djurgården, Molde and Sweden midfielder Johan Arneng. This time all the pieces fell into place as the team won the Division 1 Norra handily, securing promotion to Superettan with five games still in hand, and ending the season undefeated.

The 2014 season again began with Cup success, as Allsvenskan teams Djurgården and Halmstad were dispatched in the group stages, setting up a quarterfinal with IFK Göteborg. At Ullevi, Moses Ogbu's 29th-minute header gave Sirius the win. In front of a sold-out Studenternas, Sirius faced Elfsborg in the semifinal. This time, Elfsborg got their revenge for last year's defeat, winning 4–1.

The 2014 Superettan season began well for Sirius, with a 5–1 win away to former Allsvenskan outfit Syrianska. Two somewhat surprising home defeats to Huskvarna and Varberg followed, and the team settled into a habit of playing well away but struggling at home. In the end, however, Sirius enjoyed a successful return to Superettan, finishing in sixth place, after a season that included wins against both the two directly promoted teams, Hammarby and GIF Sundsvall.

Promotion to Allsvenskan 

On 24 October 2016, Sirius defeated Halmstads BK 1–0 to gain promotion to the Allsvenskan for the first time in 42 years (since the 1973–74 season).

Season-to-season

Players

Current squad

Out on loan

Notable players 
The following players are either listed on the official IK Sirius website or have represented their national team.

 Hans Mild
 Hans Selander
 Hasse Nilsson
 Henrik Östlin
 Klebér Saarenpää
 Leif Eriksson
 Morgan Hedlund
 Ola Andersson
 Roland Grip
 Freddie Hill
 Sigge Parling
 Kjell Johansson
 Per Hansson
 Darren Foreman
 Golli Hashempour
 Jano Alicata
 Vadym Yevtushenko

Management

Technical staff 

Daniel Bäckström, first team head coach

Theodor Olsson, first team assistant coach

Petter Hansson, first team assistant coach

Attendances 

In recent seasons IK Sirius FK have had the following average attendances:

Honours

Cup 
 Svenska Mästerskapet:
 Runners-up (1): 1924

League 
 Superettan:
 Winners (1): 2016
 Division 1 Norra:
 Winners (1): 2013
 Runners-up (2): 2006, 2010
 Division 2 Östra Svealand:
 Winners (1): 1997

Footnotes

References

External links 
 IK Sirius – official site
 Västra Sidan – supporter site

 
Football clubs in Uppsala County
Allsvenskan clubs
Sport in Uppsala County
Association football clubs established in 1907
1907 establishments in Sweden
Sport in Uppsala
IK Sirius